Litopyllus is a genus of ground spiders that was first described by R. V. Chamberlin in 1922.  it contains only three species: L. cubanus, L. realisticus, and L. temporarius.

See also
Drassodes

References

Araneomorphae genera
Gnaphosidae
Spiders of North America